Don't Tell Me You Do is the ninth overall and fourth North American studio album by the a cappella group Rockapella. It is the first album released by the group on a North American record label. All but two of the tracks were recorded during the fall of 1997 and originally released on the independent album Rockapella. When Rockapella obtained their long-awaited North American record deal in 1998, the songs "Moments of You" and "Hold Out For Christmas" were added in the place of "Bed of Nails" and Don't Tell Me You Do was released in the spring of 1999. In 2004, when the album was re-released on Shakariki Records, the then rare 1997 studio recording of the song "Bed of Nails" from the original album, Rockapella, returned to the track list in the place of "Hold Out For Christmas", which can be found on the group's holiday album Christmas.

Track listings

Original track listing

Re-release track listing

Personnel
Scott Leonard – high tenor
Kevin Wright – tenor
Elliott Kerman – baritone
Barry Carl – bass
Jeff Thacher – vocal percussion

Notes 

1999 albums
Rockapella albums